The 2018 Nova Scotia Scotties Tournament of Hearts, the provincial women's curling championship of Nova Scotia, was held from January 9 to 14 at the Dartmouth Curling Club in Dartmouth. The winning Mary-Anne Arsenault team represented Nova Scotia at the 2018 Scotties Tournament of Hearts in Penticton, British Columbia.  At the National tournament, they finished tied for 2nd in Pool A, 3rd in the Championship pool, but lost the semi-final match.

Teams
Teams were as follows:

Round-robin standings
Final round-robin standings

Scores

January 9
Draw 1
MacDiarmid 5-4 Arsenault
Ladouceur 3-8 Brothers
Pinkney 10-5 Breen
McEvoy 4-7 Jones

Draw 2
Breen 5-2 Ladouceur
MacDiarmid 7-5 Jones
McEvoy 4-7 Arsenault
Brothers 7-4 Pinkney

January 10
Draw 3
McEvoy 8-3 Pinkney
Breen 4-8 Arsenault
Brothers 4-7 Jones
MacDiarmid 8-6 Ladouceur

Draw 4
Arsenault 8-4 Jones
Pinkney 7-5 Ladouceur
MacDiarmid 9-4 McEvoy
Brothers 9-5 Breen

January 11
Draw 5
MacDiarmid 5-3 Pinkney
Brothers 3-5 Arsenault
Breen 9-8 Jones
McEvoy 8-4 Ladouceur

January 12
Draw 6
McEvoy 6-5 Brothers  
Pinkney 9-5 Jones
Arsenault 8-1 Ladouceur
Breen 8-6 MacDiarmid  

Draw 7
Jones 7-4 Ladouceur
Breen 6-4 McEvoy
Brothers 7-5 MacDiarmid
Arsenault 8-6 Pinkney

Tiebreaker
Saturday, January 13, 8:00

Playoffs

Semifinal
Saturday, January 13, 18:00

Final
Sunday, January 14, 13:00

References

Nova Scotia
Curling competitions in Halifax, Nova Scotia
Sport in Dartmouth, Nova Scotia
2018 in Nova Scotia
January 2018 sports events in Canada